Edgar Barrier (March 4, 1907 – June 20, 1964) was an American actor who appeared on radio, stage, and screen. In the 1930s he was a member of Orson Welles' Mercury Theatre and was one of several actors who played Simon Templar on The Saint radio show. He also appeared in two films with Welles, Journey into Fear (1943) and Macbeth (1948). Barrier also appeared in the 1938 Welles-directed short, Too Much Johnson, which was long believed lost but was rediscovered in 2013.

He was a guest star on a few episodes of Disney's Zorro as Don Cornelio Esperon. 

Barrier was born in New York City and died in Hollywood, California from a heart attack.

Broadway roles
Edgar Barrier's Broadway stage credits are listed at the Internet Broadway Database.

 Mary of Scotland (1933) as Lord Douglas
 Idiot's Delight (1936) as Auguste
 The Magnificent Yankee (1946) as Mr. Justice Brandeis

Selected filmography

Le Spectre vert (1930) - Le médecin (film debut)
Too Much Johnson (1938) - Leon Dathis
Escape (1940) - Commissioner
Comrade X (1940) - Rubick
The Penalty (1941) - Burns
They Dare Not Love (1941) - Capt. Wilhelm Ehrhardt
Bombay Clipper (1942) - Man on Intercom (voice, uncredited)
Danger in the Pacific (1942) - Zambesi
Eagle Squadron (1942) - Wadislaw Borowsky
The Pride of the Yankees (1942) - Hospital Doctor
Sherlock Holmes and the Voice of Terror (1942) - Voice of Terror (voice, uncredited)
Arabian Nights (1942) - Nadan
The Adventures of Smilin' Jack (1943, Serial) - Tommy Thompson
Journey into Fear (1943) - Kuvetli
We've Never Been Licked (1943) - Nishikawa
Phantom of the Opera (1943) - Raoul Dubert
Crazy House (1943) - Studio Actor (uncredited)
Flesh and Fantasy (1943) - Stranger in Mask Shop (Episode 1)
Cobra Woman (1944) - Martok
Secrets of Scotland Yard (1944) - John Usher / Robert Usher
Nob Hill (1945) - Lash Carruthers
Cornered (1945) - DuBois, Insurance Man
A Game of Death (1945) - Erich Kreiger
Song of Mexico (1945) - Gregory Davis
Tarzan and the Leopard Woman (1946) - Dr. Ameer Lazar
Rocky (1948) - John Hammond
To the Ends of the Earth (1948) - Grieg
Adventures in Silverado (1948) - Robert Louis Stevenson
Port Said (1948) - The Great Lingallo
Macbeth (1948) - Banquo, the only Shakespearean role he played on film
Rogues' Regiment (1948) - Colonel Mauclaire
The Secret of St. Ives (1949) - Sgt. Carnac
Last of the Buccaneers (1950) - George Mareval
Joe Palooka in the Squared Circle (1950) - Dist. Atty. Michael Brogden
Cyrano de Bergerac (1950) - Cardinal Richelieu, a role created for the film (uncredited)
Hurricane Island (1951) - Ponce de León
The Whip Hand (1951) - Dr. Edward Keller
Prince of Pirates (1953) - Count Blanco
Destination Gobi (1953) - Yin Tang (uncredited)
Count the Hours (1953) - Dist. Atty. Jim Gillespie
The War of the Worlds (1953) - Prof. McPherson (uncredited)
The Stand at Apache River (1953) - Cara Blanca
The Golden Blade (1953) - Caliph
The Saracen Blade (1954) - Baron Rogliano
Princess of the Nile (1954) - Shaman
Silver Lode (1955) - Thad Taylor, Attorney (uncredited)
Rumble on the Docks (1956) - Pete Smigelski
The Giant Claw (1957) - Dr. Karol Noymann
Juke Box Rhythm (1959) - Ambassador Truex
On the Double (1961) - Blankmeister
Snow White and the Three Stooges (1961) - King Augustus
Pirates of Tortuga (1961) - Sir Thomas Mollyford
Irma la Douce (1963) - Gen. Lafayette (uncredited) (final film)

References

External links
 The Saint.org profile
 
 

1907 births
1964 deaths
Male actors from New York City
American male film actors
American male stage actors
American male radio actors
American male television actors
20th-century American male actors
Burials at Westwood Village Memorial Park Cemetery